Lepturges angulatus is a species of longhorn beetle of the subfamily Lamiinae. It was described by Humphrey Critchley-Salmonson in 1852.

References

Lepturges
Beetles described in 1852